is a Japanese sprinter. He competed in the men's 400 metres at the 2000 Summer Olympics.

References

1979 births
Living people
Place of birth missing (living people)
Japanese male sprinters
Olympic male sprinters
Olympic athletes of Japan
Athletes (track and field) at the 2000 Summer Olympics
World Athletics Championships athletes for Japan
Japan Championships in Athletics winners